The 1902 Marshall Thundering Herd football team represented Marshall College (now Marshall University) in the 1902 college football season. The team did not have a coach, and outscored their opponents 65–2 in seven games.

The 1902 season marked the fourth undefeated season in a row for Marshall.

Schedule

References

Marshall
Marshall Thundering Herd football seasons
College football undefeated seasons
Marshall Thundering Herd football